The Great Lakes region of North America is a binational Canadian–American region that includes portions of eight U.S. states: Illinois, Indiana, Michigan, Minnesota, New York, Ohio, Pennsylvania, and Wisconsin along with the Canadian province of Ontario. Quebec is at times included as part of the region because, although it is not in a Great Lake watershed, it encompasses most of the St. Lawrence River watershed, part of a continuous hydrologic system that includes the Great Lakes.  The region centers on the Great Lakes and forms a distinctive historical, economic, and cultural identity. A portion of the region also encompasses the Great Lakes megalopolis.

Participating state and provincial governments are represented in the Conference of Great Lakes and St. Lawrence Governors and Premiers, which also serves as the Secretariat to the Great Lakes St. Lawrence Compact and the Great Lakes–Saint Lawrence River Basin Sustainable Water Resources Agreement.

The Great Lakes region takes its name from the corresponding geological formation of the Great Lakes Basin, a narrow watershed encompassing the Great Lakes, bounded by watersheds to the region's north (Hudson Bay), west (Mississippi), and east and south (Ohio, part of the Mississippi watershed). To the east, the rivers of St. Lawrence, Richelieu, Hudson, Mohawk and Susquehanna form an arc of watersheds east to the Atlantic.

The Great Lakes region, as distinct from the Great Lakes Basin, defines a unit of sub-national political entities defined by the U.S. states and the Canadian province of Ontario encompassing the Great Lakes watershed, and the states and province bordering one or more of the Great Lakes.

Geography

The Palaeozoic strata are parts of a great area of similar layers hundreds of feet in thickness. These strata decline gently southward from the great upland of the Laurentian Highlands of eastern Canada. The visible upland area of today was a small part of the primeval continent with the remainder of it still buried under a Palaeozoic cover. The visible part was the last part of the primeval continent to sink under the advancing Palaeozoic seas. This district may be considered an ancient coastal plain. The weaker layers are worn down in sub-parallel belts of lower land between the upland and the belts of more resistant strata, which rise in uplands. Illustrations of this type of forms are found in the district of the Great Lakes. The chief upland belt or escarpment is formed by the firm Niagara limestone/dolomite, which takes its name from the gorge and falls cut through the upland by the Niagara River. The Niagara Escarpment has a relatively strong slope or enfacing escarpment on the side towards the upland, and a long gentle slope on the other side. Its continuity and its contrast with the associated lowlands on the underlying and overlying weak strata make it an important feature. The escarpment would lie straight east–west if the slant of the strata were uniformly to the south. However, the strata are somewhat warped and so the escarpment's course is strongly convex to the north in the middle, gently convex to the south at either end.

The escarpment begins where its determining limestone/dolosmite begins, in west-central New York. There, it separates the lowlands that separate Lake Ontario from Lake Erie. It curves to the northwest through the Ontario province to the island belt that divides the Georgian Bay from Lake Huron. From there, it heads westward through the land-arm between Lake Superior and Lake Michigan and southwestward into the narrow points dividing Green Bay from Lake Michigan. Finally, it fades away with the thinning out of the limestone and is hardly traceable across the Mississippi River. The arrangement of the Great Lakes closely matches the course of the lowlands worn on the two belts of weaker strata on either side of the Niagara escarpment. Lake Ontario, Georgian Bay and Green Bay occupy depressions in the lowland on the inner side of the escarpment. Lake Erie, Lake Huron and Lake Michigan lie in depressions in the lowland on the outer side. When the two lowlands are traced eastward, they become confluent after the Niagara limestone has faded away in central New York, and the single lowland is continued under the name of the Mohawk Valley. This is an east–west longitudinal depression that has been eroded on a belt of relatively weak strata between the resistant crystalline rocks of the Adirondacks on the north and the northern escarpment of the Appalachian plateau (Catskills-Helderbergs) on the south. Early in U.S. history, this provided a vital economic route between the Atlantic seaports and the U.S. interior.

In Wisconsin, the inner lowland has an interesting feature. It is a knob of resistant quartzites, known as Baraboo Ridge, rising from the buried upland floor through the partly denuded cover of lower Palaeozoic strata. This knob or ridge can be thought of as an ancient physiographic fossil, as it is an ancient monadnock having been preserved from destructive attacks of weather by burial under sea-floor deposits. It has been recently re-exposed through the erosion of its cover. The occurrence of the lake basins in the lowland belts on either side of the Niagara escarpment is an abnormal feature. Glacial erosion has formed them through the glacial drift obstructing the normal outlet valleys and to crustal warping in connection with or independent of the glacial sheet.

Lake Superior is unlike the other lakes. The greater part of its basin occupies a depression in the upland area, independent of the overlap of Palaeozoic strata. The western half of the basin occupies a trough of synclinal structure. The Great Lakes receive the drainage of a small peripheral land area, enclosed by a water-parting from the rivers that run to Hudson Bay or the Gulf of Saint Lawrence on the north and to the Gulf of Mexico on the south.

The three lakes of the middle group: Lake Michigan,  Lake Huron and Lake Erie stand at practically the same level. Lake Michigan and Lake Huron are connected by the Straits of Mackinac with the Mackinac Bridge spanning the straits. Lake Huron and Lake Erie are connected by the St. Clair River and Detroit River, with the small Lake St. Clair between them. The land northeast of the rivers is undergoing a slow elevation. The original valley that is thought to have connected the two depressions through the Niagara Escarpment is thought to have been at the present route of the Welland Canal, and to have been completely filled with glacial drift. The same is true for the St. Lawrence, where there may not have been an original valley. The Ontarian River that was a precursor to Lake Ontario is thought to have drained westward, and the St. Lawrence drainage to have been created by subsidence due to the weight of the ice sheet.

History

Pre-Columbian history 
Paleo-Indian cultures were the earliest in North America, with a presence in the Great Plains and Great Lakes areas from about 12,000 BCE to around 8,000 BCE. Prior to European settlement, Iroquoian people lived around Lakes Erie and Ontario, Algonquian peoples around most of the rest, and a variety of other indigenous nation-peoples including the Menominee, Ojibwa, Illinois, Pottawatmie, Huron, Shawnee, Erie, Fox, Miami, Meskwaki and Ho-Chunk (Winnebago). With the first permanent European settlements in the early seventeenth century, all these nation-peoples developed an extensive fur trade with French, Dutch, and English merchants in the St. Lawrence, Hudson and Mohawk Valleys, and Hudson's Bay, respectively.

European Exploration and Early Settlement 

The prospects of fur monopolies and discovery of a fabled Northwest Passage to Asia generated sporadic but intense competition among the three most powerful northwest Europe imperial nations to control the territory.  A century and a half of naval and land wars among France, The Netherlands and Britain resulted finally in British control of the region, from the Ohio River to the Arctic, and from the Atlantic to the Mississippi. Beyond the region, North American claims remained disputed among Britain, France, Spain and Russia.

Britain defeated France decisively at the Battle of the Plains of Abraham near Quebec City in 1759, and the Treaty of Paris (1763) that ended The Seven Years' War, known in America as the French and Indian War ceded the entire region to the victor.  Indian Reserve is the historical term for this largely uncolonized area.set aside in the Royal Proclamation of 1763 for use by Native Americans, who already inhabited it.  The British government had contemplated establishing an Indian barrier state in the portion of the reserve west of the Appalachian Mountains, and bounded by the Ohio and Mississippi rivers and the Great Lakes.  Britain's claims were intensely disputed by a confederation of Indians during Pontiac's Rebellion, which induced major concessions to still sovereign Indian nations; and by the Iroquois Confederacy, whose six member nations-Mohawk, Oneida, Onondaga, Cayuga, Seneca and Tuscarora-never conceded sovereignty to either Britain or, later, The United States.

During the American Revolution, the region was contested between Britain and rebellious American colonies.  Hoping for favorable claims of territorial control in an eventual peace treaty with Britain, American adventurers led by Kentucky militia leader George Rogers Clark briefly occupied village settlements, including Cahokia, Kaskaskia and Vincennes unopposed, with passive support from Francophone inhabitants.  In the Peace of Paris (1784) Britain ceded what became known as the Northwest Territory, the area bounded by Great Lakes, Mississippi and Ohio rivers, and the eastern colonies of New York and Pennsylvania, to the fledgling United States.  Britain, which may have entertained ambitions to repossess the area if America failed to govern it, retained control over its forts and licensed fur trade for fifteen years. By well-established trade and military routes across the Great Lakes, the British continued to supply not only their own troops but a wide alliance of Native American nations through Detroit, Fort Niagara, Fort Michilimackinac, and so on, until these posts were turned over to the United States following the Jay Treaty (1794).

During the Confederacy Period of 1781–1789, the Continental Congress passed three ordinances whose authority was unclear regarding the region's governance on the American side.  The Land Ordinance of 1784 established the broad outlines of future governance.  The territory would be divided into six states, which would be given broad powers of constitutional instituting, and admitted to the nation as equal members.  The Land Ordinance of 1785 specified the manner in which land would be distributed in the Territory, favoring sale in small parcels to settlers who would work their own farms.

The Northwest Ordinance of 1787 defined the political protocols by which American states south of the lakes would enter the union as political equals with the original thirteen colonies. The ordinance, adopted in its final form just before the writing of the United States Constitution, was a sweeping, visionary proposal to create what was at the time a radical experiment in democratic governance and economy.  The Northwest Ordinance of 1787 prohibited slavery, restricted primogeniture, mandated universal public education, provided for affordable farm land to people who settled and improved it, and required peaceful, lawful treatment of the Indian population.  The ordinance prohibited the establishment of state religion and established civic rights that foreshadowed the United States Bill of Rights.  Civil rights included freedom from cruel and unusual punishment, trial by jury, and exemption from unreasonable search and seizure.  States were authorized to organize constitutional conventions and petition for admission as states equal to the original thirteen. Five states evolved from its provisions: Ohio, Indiana, Michigan, Illinois, and Wisconsin. The northeastern section of Minnesota, from the Mississippi to St. Croix River, also fell under ordinance jurisdiction and extended the constitution and culture of the Old Northwest to the Dakotas.  The surge of settlement generated tension culminating in the Battle of Fallen Timbers in 1794.

Britain, fearing that fast American settlement could lead to annexation of its western provinces, countered with The Constitution Act of 1791, granting limited self-government to Canadian provinces and creating two new provinces out of Canada: Lower Canada (today's Quebec) and Upper Canada (Ontario).

Development of transportation 

Settlement and economic expansion on both sides accelerated after the 1825 opening of The Erie Canal, an astonishingly successful public venture that effectively integrated markets and commerce between the Atlantic seaboard and the region. The region on both sides of the border became a vast research and design laboratory for agricultural machinery and techniques. Owner-operator family farms transformed both demographics and ecology into a vast terrain of farmlands, producing primarily wheat and corn. In western New York and northeast Ohio, the St. Lawrence, Mohawk, and Hudson rivers provided outlets for commercial corn and wheat, while The Ohio River let agricultural products from western Pennsylvania and southern Ohio, Indiana and Illinois journey downstream to New Orleans. Mining, primarily soft metals of copper, zinc, and lead; and timber to supply rapidly expanding sawmills that supplied lumber for new settlements.

Agricultural and industrial production generated distinctive political and social cultures of independent republican producers, who consolidated an ideology of personal liberty, free markets, and great social visions, often expressed in religious terms and enthusiasms.   The region's alliance of antislavery with free soil movements contributed troops and agricultural goods that proved critical in the Union's victory. The Homestead and Morrill Acts, donating federal land to extend the agrarian economic franchise, and support state universities, modeled western expansion and education for all future states.

The British-Canadian London Conference of 1866, and subsequent Constitution Act of 1867 analogously derived from political, and some military, turmoil in the former jurisdiction of Upper Canada, which was renamed and organized in the new dominion as the province of Ontario.  Like the provisions of the ordinance, Ontario prohibited slavery, made provisions for land distribution to farmers who owned their own land, and mandated universal public education.

Immigration and industrialization 
Industrial production, organization, and technology have made the region among the world's most productive manufacturing centers. Nineteenth-century proto-monopolies such as International Harvester, Standard Oil, and United States Steel established the pattern of American centralized industrial consolidation and eventual global dominance.  The region hosted the world's greatest concentrations of production for oil, coal, steel, automobiles, synthetic rubber, agricultural machinery, and heavy transport equipment.  Agronomy industrialized as well, in meat processing, packaged cereal products, and processed dairy products.  In response to disruptions and imbalances of power resulting from so vast a concentration of economic power, industrial workers organized the Congress of Industrial Organizations, a coherent agricultural cooperative movement, and the Progressive politics led by Wisconsin's Governor and Senator Robert M. La Follette.  State universities, professional social work, and unemployment and workers' compensation were some of the region's permanent contributions to American social policy.

The Great Lakes region has produced globally influential breakthroughs in agricultural technology, transportation and building construction. Cyrus McCormick's reaper,  John Deere's steel plow, Joseph Dart (Dart's Elevator), and George Washington Snow's balloon-frame construction are some of innovations that made significant, global impact. The University of Chicago and Case Western Reserve University figured prominently in developing nuclear power.  Automobile manufacture developed simultaneously in Ohio and Indiana and became centered in the Detroit area of Michigan. Henry Ford's movable assembly line drew on regional experience in meat processing, agricultural machinery manufacture, and the industrial engineering of steel in revolutionizing the modern era of mass production manufacturing.  Chicago-based Montgomery Ward and Sears Roebuck companies complemented mass manufactures with mass retail distribution.

Chicago, Detroit, and Cleveland carry important roles in the field of architecture. Chicago pioneered the world's first skyscraper, the Home Insurance Building designed by William LeBaron Jenney. Engineering innovation established Chicago from that time on to become one of the world's most influential epicenters of contemporary urban and commercial architecture.  Equally influential was the 1832 invention of balloon-framing in Chicago which replaced heavy timber construction requiring massive beams and great woodworking skill with pre-cut timber. This new lumber could be nailed together by farmers and settlers who used it to build homes and barns throughout the western prairies and plains. Wisconsin-born, Chicago-trained Sullivan apprentice Frank Lloyd Wright designed prototypes for architectural designs from the commercial skylight atrium to suburban ranch house.

German-born Pennsylvania immigrant John A. Roebling invented steel wire rope, a pivotal part of suspension bridges he designed and whose construction he supervised in Pittsburgh, Cincinnati and Buffalo, based on earlier successful canal aqueducts.   His most famous project was the Brooklyn Bridge. Contributions to modern transportation include the Wright brothers' early airplanes, designed and perfected in their Dayton, Ohio mechanics' workshops; distinctive Great Lakes freighters, and railroad beds constructed of wooden ties and steel rails. The early nineteenth century Erie Canal and mid-twentieth century St. Lawrence Seaway expanded the scale and capacity of massive water-born freight.

Agricultural associations joined the nineteenth century Grange, which in turn generated the agricultural cooperatives that defined much of rural political economy and culture throughout the region. Fraternal, ethnic, and civic organizations extended cooperatives and supported local ventures from insurance companies to orphanages and hospitals. The region was the political base, and provided much leadership political parties in the region.

The region's greatest institutional contributions were major corporate, labor, educational and cooperative organizations.  It hosted some of the most influential national and international corporations of the late nineteenth and early twentieth century monopoly age, including John Deere Plow, McCormack Reaper, New York Central and Erie railroads, Carnegie Steel, U.S. Steel, International Harvester and Standard Oil.

20th century 

As a result of industrialization, the population became more concentrated into urban areas. In part to balance democratic representation against the economic and political power of these corporations, the region hosted industrial labor organization, consolidated agricultural cooperatives and state educational systems. The Big Ten Conference memorializes the nation's first region in which every state sponsored major research, technical-agricultural, and teacher-training colleges and universities. The Congress of Industrial Organizations grew out of the region's coal and iron mines; steel, automobile and rubber industries; and breakthrough strikes and contracts of Ohio, Indiana, and Michigan.

The role of government also grew during the early 20th century. In the rural areas, most people obtained food and manufactured goods from neighbors and other people they knew personally. As industry and commerce grew, goods such as food, materials, and medicines were no longer made by neighbors, but by large companies. During World War II, the region became the global epicenter of motorized land vehicles, including cars, trucks and jeeps, as well as a major supplier of engine, transmission, and electrical components to the wartime aeronautics industry.  Despite extreme labor shortages, the region increased mechanization, and absorbed large numbers of women and immigrant labor, to increase its food production.

Economy

Manufacturing 
Navigable terrain, waterways, and ports spurred an unprecedented construction of transportation infrastructure throughout the region. The region is a global leader in advanced manufacturing and research and development, with significant innovations in both production processes and business organization. John D. Rockefeller's Standard Oil set precedents for centralized pricing, uniform distribution, and controlled product standards through Standard Oil, which started as a consolidated refinery in Cleveland. Cyrus McCormick's Reaper and other manufacturers of agricultural machinery consolidated into International Harvester in Chicago. Andrew Carnegie's steel production integrated large-scale open-hearth and Bessemer processes into the world's most efficient and profitable mills. The largest, most comprehensive monopoly in the world, United States Steel, consolidated steel production throughout the region. Many of the world's largest employers began in the Great Lakes region.

Mass marketing in the modern sense was born in the region.  Two competing Chicago retailers—Montgomery Ward and Sears Roebuck—developed mass marketing and sales through catalogues, mail-order distribution, and the establishment of their brand names as purveyors of consumer goods. The region's natural features, cultural institutions, and resorts make it a popular destination for tourism.

Advantages of accessible waterways, highly developed transportation infrastructure, finance, and a prosperous market base make the region the global leader in automobile production and a global business location. Henry Ford's movable assembly line and integrated production set the model and standard for major car manufactures.  The Detroit area emerged as the world's automotive center, with facilities throughout the region. Akron, Ohio became the global leader in rubber production, driven by the demand for tires. Over 200 million tons of cargo are shipped annually through the Great Lakes.

According to the Brookings Institution, if it stood alone as a country, the Great Lakes economy would be one of the largest economic units on Earth (with a $6-trillion gross regional product). This region also contains what area urban planners call the Great Lakes Megalopolis, which has an estimated 59 million people. Chicago is emerging as the third megacity in the United States, after the New York City and Los Angeles metropolitan areas, with a metro population approaching ten million. Toronto is the largest city in Canada and the fourth largest city proper in North America behind Mexico City, New York City and Los Angeles. Cities along the Great Lakes have access to the Atlantic Ocean through the St. Lawrence Seaway, making them international ports.

Financial 

Chicago is the largest economic and financial center. Chicago was named the fourth most important business center in the world in the MasterCard Worldwide Centers of Commerce Index. The 2017 Global Financial Centres Index ranked Chicago as the twenty-fourth  most competitive city in the world, behind Toronto, also in the Great Lakes region, at seventh. The Chicago Board of Trade (established 1848) listed the first ever standardized "exchange traded" forward contracts, which were called futures contracts.  As a world financial center it is home to major financial and futures exchanges, including the Chicago Stock Exchange, the Chicago Board Options Exchange (CBOE), and the Chicago Mercantile Exchange (the "Merc"), which is owned, along with the Chicago Board of Trade (CBOT) by Chicago's CME Group. The CME Group, in addition, owns the New York Mercantile Exchange (NYMEX), the Commodities Exchange Inc. (COMEX), and the Dow Jones Indexes., as well as headquarters of the Federal Reserve Bank of Chicago (the Seventh District of the Federal Reserve).

Toronto is an international centre for business and finance. Generally considered the financial capital of Canada, Toronto has a high concentration of banks and brokerage firms on Bay Street, in the Financial District. The Toronto Stock Exchange (TSX) is the world's seventh-largest stock exchange by market capitalization. The five largest financial institutions of Canada, collectively known as the Big Five, have their global operational headquarters in Toronto.

Outside of Chicago and Toronto, many other cities are host to financial centers as well. Major bank headquarters are located in Ohio including Huntington Bancshares in Columbus, Fifth Third Bank in Cincinnati, M&T Bank in Buffalo, and KeyCorp in Cleveland. Insurance companies such as Anthem in Indianapolis, Nationwide Insurance in Columbus, American Family Insurance in Madison, Wisconsin, Berkshire Hathaway in Omaha, State Farm Insurance in Bloomington, Illinois, and Progressive Insurance and Medical Mutual of Ohio in Cleveland.

Population centers

Culture

Religion
The Great Lakes region has a strong, established Lutheran tradition (as established by populations from Nordic and Germanic countries), but this tradition has become more diversified in recent years.

Education

Sports
Large professional sports leagues such as the National Football League (NFL), Major League Baseball (MLB), National Basketball Association (NBA), Women's National Basketball Association (WNBA), National Hockey League (NHL) and Major League Soccer (MLS) have team franchises in several cities in the region.

Politics
Blue collar industry traditionally represent in the Great Lakes region. In the United States, it is a stronghold of the Democratic Party though in recent years many states in Great Lakes region have become swing states. In Ontario, it is a stronghold of the Liberal Party of Canada.

Transportation

The Great Lake region is served by Interstate 94, Ontario Highway 401, Amtrak Lake Shore Limited and VIA rail services.

The three largest international airports in the Great Lake region are Chicago O'Hare, Toronto Pearson, and Detroit Metro Airport. All three airports are major airline hubs that provide nonstop connectivity to other regions and continents.

See also

 Conference of Great Lakes and St. Lawrence Governors and Premiers
 Great Lakes Integrated Sciences and Assessments
 Great Lakes Megalopolis
 Flora of the Great Lakes region (North America)
 Index: Great Lakes
 Great Lakes WATER Institute, largest academic freshwater research facility on the Great Lakes
 Midwestern United States
 Quebec City – Windsor Corridor
 Southern Ontario
 The Great Lakes region in baseball's Little League World Series
 Great Recycling and Northern Development Canal

Notes

References
 Cronon, William (1988). Nature's Metropolis: Chicago and the Great West, W.W. Norton. pp. 333–340.
 Onuf, Peter S (1987).  A History of the Northwest Ordinance, Indiana University Press.
 Taylor, Alan (2010) "The Civil War of 1812: American Citizens, British Subjects, Irish Rebels and Indian Allies", Knopf
 White, Richard (1991), The Middle Ground: Indians, Empires and Republics in The Great Lakes Region 1965-1815, Cambridge University Press

Further reading
 Chandler, Alfred D. and Hikino, Takashi (1994), Scale and Scope: The Dynamics of Industrial Capitalism: The Dynamics of Industrial Capitalism, Harvard University Press.
 Chandler, Alfred D., (1977) The Visible Hand: The Managerial Revolution in American Business, Harvard University Press.
 Cronon, William (1991). Nature's Metropolis: Chicago and the Great West, W.W. Norton.
 Foner, Eric (1970). Free Soil, Free Labor, Free Men: The Ideology of the Republican Party Before the Civil War, Oxford University Press
 Reese, T (2001). Soft Gold: A History of the Fur Trade in the Great Lakes Region and Its Impact on Native American Culture, Heritage Press.
 Shannon, Fred (1945). The Farmer's Last Frontier: Agriculture, 1860–1897, Farrar & Rineheart.
 Taylor, Alan (2007), The Divided Ground: Indians, Settlers and the Northern Borderland of the American Revolution'', Vintage Books.

External links
 The Fresh Coast – Issue briefing on Great Lakes Region
 Great Lakes Information Network
 Midwest Lakes Policy Center
 The Nature Conservancy's Great Lakes Program
 Third Coast Magazine
 Great Lakes Book Project

Region
 
Eastern Canada
Midwestern United States
Northeastern United States
Regions of Canada
Regions of the United States
Chicago metropolitan area